Informis Infinitas Inhumanitas is the second studio album by American technical death metal band Origin. The album was released on June 11, 2002 through Relapse Records.

The sample at the start of "Inhuman" is from Dogma.

The sample at the start of "Meat for the Beast" is from Interview with the Vampire

Track listing

Credits
James Lee - vocals
Paul Ryan - guitars / vocals
Jeremy Turner - guitars / vocals
Mike Flores - Bass
John Longstreth - drums
Colin E. Davis - Co producer, Engineer, Mastering
Chris Djurcic - Engineer
Kane Jewlett - Engineer
Chad Michael Ward - Artwork
Celeste Peterson - Photos

References

Origin (band) albums
2002 albums
Relapse Records albums